"Them Kids" is a song by Canadian musician Sam Roberts. It was released as the lead single from his third studio album, Love at the End of the World. The song was released through iTunes on March 4, 2008. The song was a success in Canada, reaching #1 on Canada's Rock chart and peaking at #36 on the Canadian Hot 100. It was the theme song to CBC's Hockey Night in Canada former pre-game program, Game Day.

Music video
The music video for "Them Kids" was directed by Dave Pawsey and debuted on April 22, 2008. The video is a parody of The Sims.

Awards and nominations
The music video was nominated for "Video of the Year" at the 2009 Juno Awards. It was also nominated for Best Post-Production and Best Director at the 2008 MuchMusic Video Awards, winning for Best Post-Production.

Charts

References

External links

2008 singles
Sam Roberts songs
2008 songs
Songs written by Sam Roberts
Universal Music Canada singles